The 1995 season in Swedish football, starting January 1995 and ending December 1995:

Honours

Official titles

Competitions

Promotions, relegations and qualifications

Promotions

Relegations

International qualifications

Domestic results

Allsvenskan 1995

Allsvenskan qualification play-off 1995

Division 1 Norra 1995

Division 1 Södra 1995

Division 1 qualification play-off 1995 
1st round

2nd round

Svenska Cupen 1994–95 
Final

National team results

References 
Print

Online

External links

 
Seasons in Swedish football